The Church of St Michael and All Angels is a Church of Ireland church in Millicent, Clane, County Kildare, Ireland.

Location
The church is located in the Millicent Demesne, 2 km south of Clane and 1.3 km northwest of Millicent House.

History and architecture

The church was built in the 1880s and designed by James Franklin Fuller (1835–1924). It is built of local limestone and New Red Sandstone (Cumberland sandstone).

References

External links
Parish website

19th-century Church of Ireland church buildings
Clane
Church of Ireland church buildings in the Republic of Ireland
Churches in County Kildare
19th-century churches in the Republic of Ireland